The Đồng Đậu culture (c. 1,500-1,000 BC) was a culture of the Middle Bronze Age in Vietnam. The pottery of the Đồng Đậu culture is distinguished from Phùng Nguyên culture pottery by parallel markings.

Gallery

References

Ancient Vietnam
Archaeological cultures of Southeast Asia
Archaeological cultures in Vietnam
Bronze Age cultures of Asia
1st millennium BC in Vietnam